Thomas W. Thrower (born c. 1937) is a former American football coach. He served as the head football coach at Southeast Missouri State University from 1968 to 1973, compiling a record of 37–22–2. Thrower played college football as a halfback at Southeast Missouri State from 1957 to 1959 under head coach Kenneth Knox. Following his graduation from Southeast Missouri State in 1960, he coached football at Dexter High School in Dexter, Missouri, from which he had graduated in 1955. After coaching four years at Dexter, he spent a year coaching football at Holtville High School in Holtville, California, before returning to Southeast Missouri State in 1965 to work as an assistant coach under Knox. Thrower coached the defensive backfield for three seasons before succeeding Knox as head coach in 1968. He resigned from his head coaching post at Southeast Missouri State in November 1973 following a conflict over regulations set by the Missouri Intercollegiate Athletic Association (MIAA) regarding spring practice and scholarships.

Head coaching record

College

References

1930s births
Living people
American football halfbacks
Southeast Missouri State Redhawks football coaches
Southeast Missouri State Redhawks football players
High school football coaches in California
High school football coaches in Missouri
People from Dexter, Missouri
Coaches of American football from Missouri
Players of American football from Missouri